Alexander Fyodorovich Zasyadko (September 7, 1910, Gorlovka – September 5, 1963, Moscow) was a Soviet economic, state and party leader.

He was a Hero of Socialist Labour (1957), Deputy of the Supreme Soviet of the Soviet Union of 2–6 Convocations and Member of the Central Committee of the Communist Party of the Soviet Union in 1952–1956 and 1961–1963.

Biography
He was born on September 7, 1910 in the village of Gorlovka, Bakhmut Uyezd, Yekaterinoslav Governorate. His father was a miner.

From 1925–1927, he studied at the industrial school in Izum. In 1935, he graduated from the Donetsk Mining Institute.

From 1924–1925, he was an apprentice of a locksmith at the Lugansk Railway Carriage–Locomotive Plant;
From 1927–1930, he a mechanic at Mine No. 8 in Gorlovka, a mechanic–fitter at the Mine Named After the United State Political Administration in Novoshakhtinsk (Azov–Black Sea Territory);
From 1935, he was Chief Mechanic, Assistant Chief Engineer, Chief Engineer, Manager of Mine No. 10–bis;
From 1939, Deputy Head of Glavugol, Head of the Stalinugol Combine;
In 1941–1942 – Head of the Molotovugol Combine;
In 1942–1943 – Deputy People's Commissar of the Coal Industry of the Soviet Union – Head of the Tulaugol Combine;
In 1943–1946 – Deputy People's Commissar of the Coal Industry of the Soviet Union – Head of the Stalinugol Combine;
In 1946–1947 – Deputy Minister of Construction of Fuel Enterprises of the Soviet Union;
Since January 17, 1947, the Minister of the Coal Industry of the Western Regions of the Soviet Union;
Since December 28, 1948, the Minister of the Coal Industry of the Soviet Union. According to Serov, in 1951, Zasyadko insisted on replenishing the coal industry enterprises with additional contingents of prisoners. In March 1955, he was relieved of his post "due to unsatisfactory work";
Since March 2, 1955, Deputy Minister of the Coal Industry of the Soviet Union;
Since August 8, 1955 to 1956 – Minister of the Coal Industry of the Ukrainian Soviet Socialist Republic;
Since May 24, 1957 to March 31, 1958, Head of the Coal Industry Department of the State Planning Committee of the Council of Ministers of the Soviet Union – Minister of the Soviet Union;
Since March 31, 1958 – Deputy Chairman of the Council of Ministers of the Soviet Union, at the same time, since April 22, 1960, Chairman of the State Scientific and Economic Council of the Council of Ministers of the Soviet Union;
On November 9, 1962, he retired for health reasons.

He died on September 5, 1963, in Moscow.

Awards
Hammer and Sickle Medal (April 26, 1957);
Five Orders of Lenin (February 17, 1939; October 20, 1943; January 1, 1948; September 4, 1948; April 26, 1957; September 6, 1960);
Order of the Red Banner of Labour (August 29, 1953);
Medals, including "For Labour Valour" (September 4, 1948).

Remembrance
Avenue in Donetsk bears his name;
Zasyadko coal mine in Donetsk;
Zasyadko Square in the town of Horlivka.

References

Sources

To the 100th Anniversary of Zasyadko

1910 births
1963 deaths
People from Horlivka
Central Committee of the Communist Party of the Soviet Union members
Donetsk National Technical University alumni
Second convocation members of the Supreme Soviet of the Soviet Union
Fourth convocation members of the Supreme Soviet of the Soviet Union
Fifth convocation members of the Supreme Soviet of the Soviet Union
Sixth convocation members of the Supreme Soviet of the Soviet Union
Members of the Supreme Soviet of the Russian Soviet Federative Socialist Republic, 1959–1963
Heroes of Socialist Labour
Recipients of the Order of Lenin
Recipients of the Order of the Red Banner of Labour
Burials at Novodevichy Cemetery